Lee Ho-jung (born March 15, 1997) is a South Korean retired ice dancer. With partner Richard Kang-in Kam, she is a two-time national medalist and has competed in the free dance at four ISU Championships. She announced on April 3, 2017 that their partnership has been dissolved.

Career

Single skating 
Lee began skating in 2005. As a single skater, she was coached by Choi Hyung-kyung and Shin Hea-sook in Seoul. She qualified to the free skate at the 2011 World Junior Championships and finished 23rd overall.

Ice dancing 
Lee teamed up with Richard Kang-in Kam in September 2014. At the 2015 World Junior Championships in Tallinn, Estonia, they qualified to the final segment by placing 20th in the short dance and went on to finish 19th overall.

Lee/Kam made their senior international debut in February 2016 at the Four Continents Championships in Taipei, Taiwan; they ranked 11th in the short dance, 9th in the free dance, and 10th overall. In March, they placed 14th at the 2016 World Junior Championships in Debrecen, Hungary.

Post-competitive career 
In addition to continuing her education at Sungshin Women's University, Lee works as a skating coach.

Programs

With Kam

Single skating

Competitive highlights

With Kam

Single skating

References

External links 
 
 
 Lee Ho-jung at Tracings.net

1997 births
South Korean female ice dancers
South Korean female single skaters
Living people
Figure skaters from Seoul
Figure skaters at the 2017 Asian Winter Games